György Marx (25 May 1927 – 2 December 2002) was a Hungarian physicist, astrophysicist, science historian and professor. He discovered the lepton numbers and established the law of lepton flavor conservation.

Life
He was the first non-British laureate of the Bragg Medal of the Institute of Physics, in 2001. He received it for his "outstanding contributions to physics education".

Marx authored a book about several of the 20th century's exceptional Hungarian scientists, The Voice of the Martians.

Death

Marx died on the December 2, 2002 in Budapest after a serious illness. On December 18 he was buried at the Farkasréti Cemetery with Reformed ceremony in the presence of his family, friends, disciples, colleagues and fellow scientists. Szilveszter E. Vizi, neuroscientist and president of the Hungarian Academy of Sciences said the prayer for him.

References

1927 births
2002 deaths
Scientists from Budapest
Eötvös Loránd University alumni
Hungarian nuclear physicists
Theoretical physicists
Members of the Hungarian Academy of Sciences
Hungarian Calvinist and Reformed Christians
Burials at Farkasréti Cemetery